The Triumph Tour was a concert tour by The Jacksons, covering the United States and Canada from July 8 to September 26, 1981. The tour grossed a total of $5.5 million, setting a record breaking four sold out concerts in Inglewood, California, just southwest of Los Angeles.

History
By 1981, the Jacksons had regained success as a platinum-selling recording group with two albums, Destiny (1978) and Triumph (1980). Additionally, lead singer Michael Jackson was in the final stages of promoting his 1979 multi-platinum album, Off the Wall. This tour allowed Michael to bring in new show production ideas more to his liking. Inspired by Earth, Wind & Fire's live shows, Michael created the costumes and designed the stage. It was on this tour that he first wore his sequined glove, which later became world-famous after his Motown 25 performance. He and his brothers also collaborated on an intro that signaled similarities to their "Can You Feel It" music video. As it had been for many years, the choreography was done by Michael, Jackie and Marlon Jackson. The shows included magical elements designed by Doug Henning—for example, Michael disappearing in smoke during "Don't Stop 'Til You Get Enough".

Touring tenure
The Triumph Tour began in Memphis, Tennessee and ended with a sold-out week of shows in Inglewood. Each show earned highly positive reviews, in part due to Michael's leadership and showmanship. His brothers also earned praise, particularly for Randy's and Tito's musicality, and Marlon's dance ability. The tour marked the last truly integrated group effort, as Michael's solo career would soon eclipse his success with his brothers. The tour was so well-received and popular that Epic had the brothers record a variety of shows, and compile them for an upcoming live release. It's rumored that the tracks were recorded during stops in Memphis, New York City, Buffalo and Providence. The live album, The Jacksons Live!, came out in the winter of 1981, and went gold in its initial run. Current sales are two million.

After the tour ended, Michael went back to record Thriller, his follow-up to Off the Wall (1979). It would be three years before the Jacksons would go back on the road again. Rolling Stone later named the Triumph Tour one of the best 25 tours between 1967 and 1987. To showcase the success of the Triumph Tour, Michael Jackson commented that it was their first show without any marginal material. After the Triumph tour, Michael patterned the Victory Tour (1984) and his Bad World Tour (1987–1989).

Stage
The stage was dark and had three groups of strobe lights, all of them containing different colors of lights, facing the stage diagonally. The stage also had a spotlight that followed the main performers. In addition to the lighting, the musicians played their instruments on fixtures (the horn section to the left of the stage, the drums to the center, and keyboards to the right; with the exception of the guitarists and Randy Jackson who played the piano, keyboards, and assorted percussion).

Opening act
 Stacy Lattisaw

Set list
 "Can You Feel It"
 "Things I Do for You"
 "Off the Wall"
 "Ben"
 "Walk Right Now"
 "This Place Hotel"
 "She's Out of My Life"
 "I Want You Back" / "ABC" / "The Love You Save"
 "I'll Be There"
 "Rock with You"
 "Lovely One"
 "Workin' Day and Night"
 "Don't Stop 'Til You Get Enough"
 "Shake Your Body (Down to the Ground)"

Tour dates

Dates of preparation

Cancelled date

Box office score data

Personnel
The Jacksons
Michael Jackson – vocals
Jackie Jackson – vocals, percussion
Tito Jackson – guitar, vocals
Marlon Jackson – vocals, percussion 
Randy Jackson – vocals, congas, piano, keyboards

Band
David Williams – guitar
Bill Wolfer – synthesizer
Mike McKinney – bass
Jonathan Moffett – drums
Wesley Phillips, Cloris Grimes, Alan (Funt) Prater, Roderick (Mac) McMorris  – horns

Notes

References

The Jacksons concert tours
1981 concert tours